Don't Go Breaking My Heart is a 2011 Hong Kong-Chinese romantic comedy film directed by Johnnie To and Wai Ka-fai,  making this the twelfth film they have collaborated on together. The film stars Louis Koo, Daniel Wu and Gao Yuanyuan. The film opened the 35th Hong Kong International Film Festival on 20 March 2011. It was then released theatrically in Hong Kong on 31 March 2011.

Plot
Chi-yan (Gao Yuanyuan) is an analyst who just broke up with her boyfriend (Terence Yin) as he was having a baby with another woman (Selena Li). Sean (Louis Koo), a CEO of a broker firm, knows Chi-yan as her office is just opposite of his. He liked Chi-yan, and starts to take action when he sees what happened in the bus between Chi-yan, her ex, and his current wife. Kevin (Daniel Wu), an architect and an alcoholic, helped Chi-yan out when she was heartbroken about her ex. With Chi Yan's support Kevin decides to pick up designing again, and arrange meet up with her again a week later. Chi-yan forgets about it when she starts flirting with Sean. She and Sean arrange to meet on the night Chi-yan is supposed to meet Kevin. Sean goes to clear up a misunderstanding with a woman named Angelina, which leads to a one-night stand. Chi-yan is left waiting for Sean and Kevin is waiting for Chi-yan. When Chi-yan find out what Sean did she ends their relationship. Sean later leaves his office when the economy crisis causes his company to lose a large sum of money and goes to the US.
Three years later, Sean comes back into Chi-yan's life as her new boss. He tries to win her heart again, but she is put off because he is easily seduced by women. While Chi-yan is becoming increasingly disappointed with Sean, Kevin also comes back into her life. After their last meeting, he successfully started an architecture firm and moves to where Sean's old office was located. Both guys court her and she must choose between the aggressive "flower-hearted" Sean or the sincere Kevin.

Cast

Production
Daniel Wu was contacted by Johnnie To in May 2010 for his role in the film. Wu was excited to work with To, stating that he's "always wanted to work with him. I've worked with all the big directors in Hong Kong except for him and Wong Kar-wai, and now I can tick Johnnie off my list." The ending of Don’t Go Breaking My Heart was unknown to the actors until the final week of shooting.

Release
Don't Go Breaking My Heart had its world premiere at the 5th Osaka Asian Film Festival on March 10, 2011. Along with Quattro Hong Kong 2, it was the opening film at the Hong Kong International Film Festival. The film was released on March 31, 2011 in Hong Kong and China. It received its North American premiere at the Fantasia Festival in Montreal, Quebec, Canada on  July 25, 2011.

Reception
Film Business Asia gave Don't Go Breaking My Heart a six out of ten rating referring to it as a "entertaining but shallow rom-com from Johnnie To that doesn't really engage the emotions". Time Out Hong Kong gave the film a four out of six rating praising the dialogue and "expert comic timing". The Hollywood Reporter opined that "To dazzles with non-stop filmmaking tricks, so many will be happy to forget the disingenuity of the creative premise". Variety referred to the film as "tightly plotted and frequently funny, with suave lead perfs and glossy production design and lensing" while noting that "this mainstream, mostly Mandarin-language pic is squarely aimed at mainland audiences and will do midrange biz in the region, but won't travel much elsewhere."

Theme songs
"愛很簡單" (Love is Simple) by David Tao
(Used by Sean when expressing his love and proposing to Chi-yan)

"我願意" (I'm Willing) by Faye Wong
(Used by Kevin when expressing his love and proposing to Chi-yan)

References

External links
 Official website
 
 
 Don't Go Breaking My Heart at Hong Kong Cinemagic

2011 films
2011 romantic comedy films
Hong Kong romantic comedy films
Chinese romantic comedy films
2010s Cantonese-language films
Media Asia films
Milkyway Image films
Films directed by Johnnie To
Films directed by Wai Ka-Fai
Films set in Hong Kong
Films shot in Hong Kong
Films with screenplays by Wai Ka-fai
2010s Hong Kong films